Tarmo Loodus (born 18 February 1958 in Lihula) is an Estonian educator and politician.

In 1996, he was elected mayor of Viljandi. From 1999 to 2002, he was Minister of the Interior.

References

Living people
1958 births
Estonian educators
Isamaa politicians
Ministers of the Interior of Estonia
Mayors of places in Estonia
Tallinn University alumni
People from Lääneranna Parish